Circle of Atonement is a 2015 South Korean mystery drama film starring Sung Dong-il, Son Ho-jun and Kim Yoo-jung, and directed by Park Eun-gyoung and Lee Dong-ha.

The film premiered at the Busan International Film Festival on 2 October 2015. It was released in theaters on 15 October 2015.

Plot
Detective Lee Sang-won (Sung Dong-il) and his daughter, Lee Jang-hyun (Kim Yoo-jung), meet high school teacher Nam Chul-woong (Son Ho-jun) and discover common ties to a tragic murder case that happened 10 years earlier.

Cast 
 Sung Dong-il as Detective Lee Sang-won
 Son Ho-jun as Nam Chul-woong
 Kim Yoo-jung as Lee Jang-hyun
 Im Hyung-joon as Shin Ji-chul
 Seo Yea-ji as Kang Yoo-sin
 Lee Kyung-jin as Yoo-shin's mother
 Choi Yoo-ri as Shin Ki-jung
 Jin Gyeong as Reporter Kim

References

External links 
 

South Korean mystery drama films
2010s South Korean films